Operación Lince Norte (Operation Lynx North), was a military operation conducted by the Mexican Secretariat of National Defense, from July 16 to August 4, 2011, in the states of Coahuila, Nuevo Leon, Tamaulipas and San Luis Potosi. The prime objective was to weaken the Los Zetas Cartel and the Gulf cartel.

During the operation, 26 attacks from the criminals were prevented and repelled.

Seized assets and Achievements
 1,217 firearms
 3.3 tons of marijuana
 39,000,700 United States dollars
 260 vehicles
 188 communication equipments
 14 Real estate propertiess

References

Battles of the Mexican drug war
Military operations involving Mexico
Operations against organized crime in Mexico
Gulf Cartel
Los Zetas